Geesje Mesdag-van Calcar (1850–1936) was a Dutch  painter. She is known for her landscape, flower, and genre paintings.

Biography
Mesdag-van Calcar was born 2 July 1850 in Hoogezand. She attended the Academie Minerva in Groningen She also studied with Paul Gabriël in Paris. 

She married fellow painter Taco Mesdag (1829–1902) and the couple settled in The Hague. Both were members of the Pulchri Studio and also associated with the Hague School. They also owned property in Vries, Drenthe where they painted in the summer.

Mesdag-van Calcar  exhibited her work at the Palace of Fine Arts at the 1893 World's Columbian Exposition in Chicago, Illinois. She received an honorable mention at the Paris Exposition Universelle of 1889.

After her husband's death in 1902, Mesdag-van Calcar moved to Kortenhoef, where she built a studio. Her work from that time was in an Impressionistic style.

Hugenholtz died 4 April 1934 in The Hague.

Gallery

References

1850 births 
1936 deaths
Dutch women painters
19th-century Dutch women artists
20th-century Dutch women artists
19th-century Dutch painters
20th-century Dutch painters
People from Hoogezand-Sappemeer